David Mintz may refer to:
David Hammerstein Mintz (born 1955), American-born Spanish politician
David Mintz, New York restaurateur and founder of Tofutti Brands
David Liebe Hart (born 1955, uses the name David Liebe Mintz), American outsider musician, street performer, artist, puppeteer and actor
David Mintz (judge) (born 1959), judge of the Supreme Court of Israel